Marc-André Cratère (born 3 February 1973) is a French wheelchair fencer who competes at international fencing competitions. He is a Paralympic silver medalist. He is also a triple World champion and European champion in the épée and sabre.

References

External links
 
 

1973 births
Living people
People from Le Robert
Paralympic wheelchair fencers of France
Wheelchair fencers at the 2008 Summer Paralympics
Wheelchair fencers at the 2012 Summer Paralympics
Wheelchair fencers at the 2016 Summer Paralympics
Medalists at the 2012 Summer Paralympics